Huang Kan-lin (born 12 March 1975) is a Taiwanese baseball coach. He played for the Uni-President Lions of the Chinese Professional Baseball League in center field for the Lions.  He is currently retired, and is coaching the same team. He is the all-time leader in stolen bases of Chinese Professional Baseball League , with 295 in total .

Personal life
Huang is currently married with CPop singer A-Lin, a Taiwanese singer with aborigine background. They were engaged on May 26, 2007, when A-Lin was approximately two months into pregnancy.

References

1975 births
Living people
Asian Games bronze medalists for Chinese Taipei
Asian Games medalists in baseball
Baseball outfielders
Baseball players at the 1994 Asian Games
Medalists at the 1994 Asian Games
People from Chiayi County
Taiwanese baseball players
Uni-President 7-Eleven Lions players
Uni-President 7-Eleven Lions coaches
Uni-President 7-Eleven Lions managers